Kajut (also Romanized as Kajūt; also known as Gachūt and Gajūt) is a village in Qaleh Darrehsi Rural District, in the Central District of Maku County, West Azerbaijan Province, Iran. At the 2006 census, its population was 743, in 201 families.

References 

Populated places in Maku County